Saël Kumbedi Nseke (born 26 March 2005) is a French professional footballer who plays as a right-back for  club Lyon.

Club career
A former youth academy player of Paris Saint-Germain and CC Taverny, Kumbedi joined Le Havre in 2019. He made his senior team debut for the club on 13 November 2021 in a 2–0 cup win against Vierzon.

On 31 August 2022, Kumbedi signed a three-year contract with Lyon until June 2025.

International career
Born in France, Kumbedi is of Congolese descent. He is a French youth international. In April 2022, he was named in France under-17 team squad for 2022 UEFA European Under-17 Championship. On 1 June 2022, he scored two goals in the final of the tournament in a 2–1 win against Netherlands.

Career statistics

Honours
France U17
UEFA European Under-17 Championship: 2022

References

External links
 Profile at the Olympique Lyonnais website
 
 

2005 births
Living people
Black French sportspeople
Association football defenders
French footballers
France youth international footballers
French sportspeople of Democratic Republic of the Congo descent
Le Havre AC players
Olympique Lyonnais players
Ligue 2 players
Championnat National 3 players